Charles II Francis of Austria (3 June 1540 – 10 July 1590) was an Archduke of Austria and ruler of  Inner Austria (Styria, Carniola, Carinthia and Gorizia) from 1564. He was a member of the House of Habsburg.

Biography

A native of Vienna, he was the third son of Ferdinand I, Holy Roman Emperor, and Anne of Bohemia and Hungary, daughter of King Vladislaus II of Hungary and his wife Anne of Foix-Candale. In 1559 and again from 1564–1568 there were negotiations for a marriage between Charles and Elizabeth I of England. Emperor Ferdinand I expected Elizabeth to promise in the proposed marriage treaty that Charles, as her widower, would succeed her if she died childless. The negotiations dragged on until Queen Elizabeth decided that she would not marry the Archduke; religion was the main obstacle to the match, apart from the Queen's character. In 1563, Charles was also a suitor of Mary, Queen of Scots, with her uncle Charles, Cardinal of Lorraine, advising her to marry Charles in order to obtain assistance in governing Scotland. Mary, however, disagreed, as did Charles's older brother Maximilian.

Unlike his brother, Emperor Maximilian II, Charles was a religious Catholic and promoted the Counter-Reformation, e.g. by inviting the Jesuits to his territory. However, in 1572, he had to make significant concessions to the Inner Austrian Estates in the Religious Pacifications of Graz, and 1578 and the Libellum of Bruck. In practice, this resulted in tolerance towards Protestantism.

As the Inner Austrian line had to bear the major burden of the wars against the Turks, the fortress of Karlstadt/Karlovac in Croatia was founded in 1579 and named after him.
Charles is also remembered as a benefactor of the arts and sciences. In particular, the composer Orlando di Lasso was one of his protégés, as was the music theorist Lodovico Zacconi.

In 1573, Charles founded the Akademisches Gymnasium in Graz, the oldest secondary school in Styria. In 1580, Charles founded a stud for horses of Andalusian origin in Lipica, Slovenia, thereby playing a leading role in the creation of the Lipizzan breed.  In 1585, Charles founded the University of Graz, which is named Karl-Franzens-Universität after him.

He died at Graz in 1590.

Charles's mausoleum in Seckau Abbey, in which other members of the Habsburg family are also buried, is one of the most important edifices of the early Baroque in the South-Eastern Alps. It was built from 1587 onwards by Alessandro de Verda and completed by Sebastiano Carlone by 1612.

Marriage and children 
On 26 August 1571, Charles married his niece Maria Anna of Bavaria in Vienna. They had 15 children, 12 of whom lived to adulthood:

Ancestors

Notes

References
 

1540 births
1590 deaths
16th-century archdukes of Austria
Nobility from Vienna
Austrian princes
Austrian Roman Catholics
Dukes of Carniola
Sons of emperors
Children of Ferdinand I, Holy Roman Emperor
Sons of kings